The Rural Municipality of Preeceville No. 334 is a rural municipality (RM) in the Canadian province of Saskatchewan within Census Division No. 9 and  Division No. 4.

History 
The RM of Preeceville No. 334 incorporated as a rural municipality on January 1, 1913.

Geography

Communities and localities 
The following urban municipalities are surrounded by the RM.

Towns
 Preeceville
 Sturgis

Villages
 Endeavour

The following unincorporated communities are within the RM.

Organized hamlets
 Ketchen
 Usherville

Localities
 Hassan
 Hinchliffe
 Lady Lake

Demographics 

Attractions 
 Lady Lake Regional Park
 Profitis Ilias Greek Orthodox Church
 Sturgis Station House Museum
 Sturgis & District Regional Park

Government 
The RM of Preeceville No. 334 is governed by an elected municipal council and an appointed administrator that meets on the second Monday of every month. The reeve of the RM is Richard Pristie while its administrator is Lisa Peterson. The RM's office is located in Preeceville.

Transportation 
 Saskatchewan Highway 9
 Saskatchewan Highway 47
 Saskatchewan Highway 49
 Saskatchewan Highway 753
 Canadian National Railway
Endeavour station
Sturgis Station

See also 
List of rural municipalities in Saskatchewan

References 

P
Division No. 9, Saskatchewan